Amycolatopsis orientalis is a Gram-positive bacterium in the phylum Actinomycetota. It produces several substances with antimicrobial properties, including the antibiotic drug vancomycin.

History 
A. orientalis was originally discovered by Edmund Kornfeld, an organic chemist at Eli Lilly and Company, in a soil sample gathered by a missionary from forests on the island of Borneo. The antibiotic vancomycin was first isolated from the bacteria in 1953.

References 

Pseudonocardiales
Bacteria described in 1956